The Eclipse Adoptium Working Group is the successor of AdoptOpenJDK.

The main goal of Adoptium is to promote and support free and open-source high-quality runtimes and associated technology for use across the Java ecosystem. To do so the Adoptium Working Group will build and provide OpenJDK based binaries under the Eclipse Temurin project. In addition to Temurin the WG creates an open test suite for OpenJDK based binaries as part of the Eclipse AQAvit project.

The Working Group was launched by Alibaba Cloud, Huawei, IBM, Karakun AG, Microsoft, New Relic, and Red Hat in March 2021.

In May 2022, the Adoptium project announced the formation of the Adoptium Marketplace.

Projects

Eclipse Temurin
The Eclipse Temurin project produces Temurin, a certified binary build of OpenJDK. The initial release in October 2021 supported Java 8, 11 and 17. The name for the project, Temurin, is an anagram of the word runtime.

History
Eclipse Adoptium originally started as AdoptOpenJDK. AdoptOpenJDK was founded in 2017 and provided enterprises with free and open-source Java runtimes.

In 2020, AdoptOpenJDK moved to the Eclipse Foundation project under the name Eclipse Adoptium. The working group produces binaries via the Eclipse Temurin project.

Members 
As of October 2022, there are 11 members:

 Alibaba Cloud
 Azul Systems
 Bloomberg L.P.
 Google
 Huawei
 IBM
 
 Karakun AG
 Microsoft
 New Relic
 Red Hat

References

External links

Java (programming language)